Wadaslintang is an Administrative village in District Wadaslintang, Wonosobo Regency, Central Java Province. Wadaslintang have postal code 56365.

Etymology
Word Wadaslintang from two words Wadas and Lintang, Wadas mean stone and Lintang (in Indonesian Bintang) mean bright. From etymology Wadaslintang means bright stone.

Division
Wadaslintang have 4 Dusun (Hamlets):
 Cangkring Hamlets (Dusun Cangkring)
 Dadapgede Hamlets (Dusun Dadapgede)
 Paras Hamlets (Dusun Paras)
 Wadaslintang Hamlets (Dusun Wadaslintang)

Population
According to Wonosobo Central Agency on Statistics, Wadaslintang Village population in 2014 are: 4570 inhabitants.

School
There are many schools in Wadaslintang
 Wadaslintang 1 Primary school (Sekolah Dasar 1 Wadaslintang)
 Wadaslintang 2 Primary school (Sekolah Dasar 2 Wadaslintang)
 Wadaslintang 3 Primary school (Sekolah Dasar 3 Wadaslintang)
 Hidayatussibyan Islamic primary school (Madrasah Ibtidaiyah Hidayatussibyan)
 Hidayatussibyan Islamic middle school (Madrasah Tsanawiyah Hidayatussibyan)
 Wadaslintang 1 Middle school
 Ma'arif High school
 Muhammadiyah High school

Health facilities
 Wadaslintang 1 Community Health Centre

Religious facilities
There are 6 mosque, 29 Musalla, 2 Church.

Galleries

References 

Villages in Central Java
Administrative villages in Central Java